Bheeshanaye Athuru Kathawak (A Drop in the Reign of Terror) is a 2003 Sri Lankan Sinhala action thriller film directed by Amaranath Jayathilake and produced by himself with the funds of NFC Films. It stars Nita Fernando and Cletus Mendis in lead roles along with Vishaka Siriwardana and Madhuranga Chandimal. Music composed by Priyanjit Wijesekara. The film also screened at  International Film Festival, Rotterdam. It is the 1017th Sri Lankan film in the Sinhala cinema.

Plot

Cast
 Nita Fernando as Mrs. Somadasa 
 Cletus Mendis as Akman
 Vishaka Siriwardana as Allan Nona
 Mahendra Perera
 Wilson Karunaratne
 G.R Perera as Somadasa 
 Sarath Kothalawala as Revolutionary Leader
 Miyuri Samarasinghe as Sopina
 Madhuranga Chandimal as Panduka
 Sandun Wijesiri as Gunaratna
 Dayasiri Hettiarachchi as Police inspector
 Anushka Nilanjani Ekanayaka as Manjula
 Nirosha Lakmali as Krishanthi
 Dinendra Ratanayke as Devinda
 Thilakaratna Liyanage as Politician
 Chandrika Munasingha as Magilin
 Chandrika Perera as Jane
 Amarakoon Arachchi as Chied editor
 Nimal Munasingha as Chuti

References

2003 films
2000s Sinhala-language films